is a Japanese actor, best known as Kudo Shinichi in Detective Conan: Kudo Shinichi e no Chousenjou and Saga Kazuma in Hanazakari no Kimitachi e. He also appears in the drama Akai Ito as Atsushi Nishino (or Akkun).

Personal life
Junpei Mizobata was born on June 14, 1989 in Hashimoto, Wakayama Japan to a family of four including Parents and sister. He likes to play drum and soccer in his leisure time. He loves Natto and Salmon.

In 2014, rumors have surfaced that Junpei and actress Nana Katase are in a relationship. While Mizobata neither admitted or denied the rumors, he apologized, "I'm sorry to have caused people trouble with reports about my personal life at this time."

Yahoo! News reported that Nana and Junpei have revealed they are a couple and are allegedly “considering marriage”.

Filmography

Film

Television

Japanese dub

Endorsements
Gree (2012)
FILA (2010)
Adidas Footwear (2010)
Ippei Chan Yaki Soba (2009)
Bouron Petit (2009)
Right On Clothing (2009)
Akai Ito x POCKY (2008)

Accolades

References

External links
 Official Website
 Junpei Mizobata on Ever Green Entertainment
 

1989 births
Living people
Japanese male film actors
People from Hashimoto, Wakayama
Actors from Wakayama Prefecture